The third wave of Walt Disney Treasures was released on May 18, 2004. It was originally planned to be released in December 2003, but was delayed for almost half a year in order to meet an increased demand with a higher number of tins produced. This wave was the first to have a certificate of authenticity with the individual number of the tin on it, replacing the number embossed on the tin. This was the final wave released with side straps.

Mickey Mouse in Living Color, Volume Two

This set picks up from where Mickey Mouse in Living Color, Volume One leaves off. This was one of the few "Treasures" sets released abroad, as well as in the United States, on April 4, 2005. Like the first volume, it was retitled Mickey Mouse in Living Colour in the UK due to American and British English spelling differences.

175,000 sets produced.

Disc one
1939
Society Dog Show
The Pointer
1940
Tugboat Mickey
Pluto's Dream House
Mr. Mouse Takes a Trip
1941
The Little Whirlwind
The Nifty Nineties
Orphan's Benefit
1942
Mickey's Birthday Party
Symphony Hour
1947
Mickey's Delayed Date
1948
Mickey Down Under
Mickey and the Seal
1951
Plutopia
R'coon Dawg
1952
Pluto's Party
Pluto's Christmas Tree
1953
The Simple Things
Bonus Features
The Sorcerer's Apprentice: This segment features not only the full cartoon from Fantasia (however, the closing segment of Mickey shaking hands with conductor Leopold Stokowski is cut here), but also a deleted scene, which showed (in pencil tests) an alternate sequence of Mickey attacking the broom with an axe (whereas in the finished product, viewers only see the shadows of the both of them, originally Mickey and the broom were supposed to be seen wholly).
Mickey and the Beanstalk: The entire sequence from Fun and Fancy Free, complete with the intertwined live action footage of Edgar Bergen, Luana Patten and Bergen's two ventriloquist dummies, Charlie McCarthy and Mortimer Snerd.
Walt Disney's Standard Parade For 1939: Easter egg bonus about a promotion made specifically for Standard Oil dealers. It starts with a whirlwind history of Disney's breakthroughs in animation with Steamboat Willie, Flowers and Trees, Three Little Pigs and Snow White and the Seven Dwarfs, and the many honors bestowed upon the filmmaker. This is followed by a parade of numerous Disney characters holding advertising signs, similar to Disney's 1932 Academy Awards parade, which appeared as a bonus feature on the "Mickey In Color, Volume One" set.
Walt Disney Performing the Voice of Mickey: Another Easter egg bonus feature, this black and white clip begins with Billy Bletcher, the voice of Black Pete, repeating a couple of lines. Then it shows Walt himself reading as Mickey Mouse with Bletcher. The dialogue is for the short "Mr. Mouse Takes a Trip."

Disc two
1983
Mickey's Christmas Carol
1990
The Prince and the Pauper
1995
Runaway Brain
Bonus Features
Mickey's Cartoon Comeback: Maltin visits Disney's Animation Research Library to interview animators Mark Henn and Andreas Deja, who discuss their first exposure to animation and Mickey. Modern animators are compared with the animators of the early Mickey Mouse shorts, who had no opportunity to study animation.
The Voice Behind the Mouse: Maltin meets the current voices of Mickey and Minnie, Wayne Allwine and Russi Taylor, who discuss the characteristics of Mickey and Minnie that they see in themselves. They compare how Mickey's voice changed over the years, including Walt Disney's tenure. Allwine and Taylor consider how Walt would probably embrace new technologies of today. Allwine shares anecdotes on Disney animation, while Taylor, his real-life wife, recalls how she prepared for her Minnie audition.
Mouse Mania: A stop-motion segment from a 1978 prime time TV special celebrating Mickey's 50th anniversary, created by animator Mike Jittlov. In a psychiatrist's office, Mickey figurines and other Disneyana join in a dance to "Baroque Hoedown", the tune used in the Main Street Electrical Parade at the Disney parks.
Mickey's Cartoon Physics: In this segment from a 1956 episode of the Walt Disney anthology series known as The Plausible Impossible (which is presented in its entirety on Wave 2's "Behind the Scenes" set), Walt discusses how impossible action can seem real in animation if there is some factual basis. We see why it makes sense for a cow's bell to ring when you pull its tail, how Mickey stretches and squishes when going up in an elevator, and other examples.
Tricks of Our Trade: In a 1957 segment from the anthology series, Walt discusses three-dimensionality in cel animation, using the multi-plane camera. Like The Plausible Impossible, this episode is found in its entirety in the "Behind the Scenes" set.
Mickey Meets the Maestro: A behind-the-scenes featurette on the meeting of Mickey and conductor James Levine in Fantasia 2000.
Color Titles from Mickey Mouse Club: The original opening sequence of The Mickey Mouse Club is shown in color. There are five different 25-second openings, one for each day of the week, each with a different theme.
The Making of Mickey's Christmas Carol: A behind-the-scenes featurette from the 1980s that examines the filmmakers' approach to the material as they determine which Disney character will portray which Dickens character, and match the right animator to each character. Producer/director Burny Mattinson, animators Glen Keane and David Block, and some of the voice actors are interviewed. Also shown is a bit of a history of Mickey and Donald.
Publicity and Memorabilia Gallery: This gallery shows posters and advertisements for the Mickey shorts on this set.
Story and Background Gallery: Sketches from some of Mickey's shorts, with notes on costumes, supporting characters, and Mickey's evolution through the years.

The Chronological Donald

This set covers the first leg of Donald Duck's long career, from 1934 to 1941. This was one of the few "Treasures" sets released abroad, as well as in the United States, on April 4, 2005.

165,000 sets produced.

Disc one
1934
The Wise Little Hen
1936
Donald and Pluto
1937
Don Donald
Modern Inventions
Donald's Ostrich
1938
Self Control
Donald's Better Self
Donald's Nephews
Polar Trappers (with Goofy)
Good Scouts
The Fox Hunt (with Goofy)
Donald's Golf Game
1939
Donald's Lucky Day
The Hockey Champ
Donald's Cousin Gus
Beach Picnic
Sea Scouts
Donald's Penguin
The Autograph Hound
Officer Duck
Bonus Features
Publicity and Memorabilia Gallery: This gallery features several images of Donald Duck on print, including posters, advertisements, comics and magazine covers. Many images are cover shots of the Mickey Mouse Magazine (later known as Walt Disney's Comics and Stories), all used to help chart the intensifying popularity of Donald.
The Story and Background Gallery: This background displays animation sketches (mostly storyboards) and background paintings from several Donald cartoons found on this set.
Clip from The Reluctant Dragon: Easter egg bonus of a clip from The Reluctant Dragon. Herein, Robert Benchley enters an orchestra room and witnesses Clarence Nash and Florence Gill performing the voices of Donald and Clara Cluck, respectively. Afterwards, Nash  teaches Benchley how to talk like Donald with excellent results. Benchley also wonders if Nash could also talk like a dragon.

Disc two
1940
The Riveter
Donald's Dog Laundry
Billposters (with Goofy)
Mr. Duck Steps Out
Put-Put Troubles
Donald's Vacation
Window Cleaners
Fire Chief
1941
Timber
Golden Eggs
A Good Time For a Dime
Early To Bed
Truant Officer Donald
Old MacDonald Duck
Donald's Camera
Chef Donald
Bonus Features
The Man Behind the Duck: A mini-biography about the original voice and alter ego of Donald, Clarence "Ducky" Nash, who had voiced Donald for 50 years. Nash lucked out and was hired for his unique whistle. This biography reveals that, in addition to Donald, Nash also voiced other Disney ducks, as well as did minor voices in Bambi and 101 Dalmatians.
The Volunteer Worker: Easter egg bonus of an additional short dating from 1940. In this cartoon, Donald goes from door to door trying to collect money for charity, but to no avail when every door he visits slams in his face. His frustrations lead him to the personal testimony of a man he meets on the street who had once benefited from charities himself.
Clip from The Reluctant Dragon: Another easter egg bonus of another clip from The Reluctant Dragon, shown in color (the first Dragon bonus was in black and white). This time, Robert Benchley visits the camera department and gets a lesson on how cartoons come to life, courtesy of Donald himself.

Walt Disney on the Front Lines

This set covers all the various cartoons that were themed to World War II.

250,000 sets produced.

Disc one
Propaganda and Entertainment
Donald Gets Drafted (1942)
The Army Mascot (1942)
The Vanishing Private (1942)
Sky Trooper (1942)
Private Pluto (1943)
Fall Out - Fall In (1943)
Victory Vehicles (1943)
The Old Army Game (1943)
Home Defense (1943)
How to Be a Sailor (1944)
Commando Duck (1944)
Educational Shorts
The Thrifty Pig (1941)
7 Wise Dwarfs (1941)
Food Will Win the War (1942)*
Out of the Frying Pan Into the Firing Line (1942)
Donald's Decision (1942)
All Together (1942)
The New Spirit (1942)
The Spirit of '43 (1943)
The Winged Scourge (1943)*
Defense Against Invasion (1943)*
The Grain That Built a Hemisphere (1943)*
Cleanliness Brings Health (1945)*
What Is Disease? (AKA The Unseen Enemy) (1945)*
Planning For Good Eating (1946)*

(*) = non-theatrical

From the Vault
Der Fuehrer's Face (1943)
Education for Death: The Making of the Nazi (1943)
Reason and Emotion (1943)
Chicken Little (1943)

Disc two
Victory Through Air Power (1943): This World War II film, meant to send a message rather than entertain, is adapted from a book by Russian-born Major Alexander P. de Seversky. It starts out with a brief but interesting history of airplanes, starting with the Wright Brothers' first flight in Kittyhawk. We see aviation being explored by various nations for various purposes and then airplanes put to limited use in World War I, followed by a series of successes in flight, before finally moving on to World War II. The film talks about the history of Major de Seversky, who later explains about how the advent of aircraft spells change in the face of traditional warfare. It then goes on to explain how the Allies chose not to embrace the use of air power and instead, used old-fashioned methods of warfare to battle the Axis powers, who used aircraft to do their dirty work. The point the film makes is that the only way for the Allies to secure victory over the robust Axis is to make heavy use of military aviation, because, as we're told, fighting on the surface puts the advantage in the hands of Adolf Hitler.
Training Shorts
Four Methods of Flush Riveting: This film, produced under the direction of the Lockheed Aircraft Corporation, a neighbor of the Disney studios, uses cheap, quick animation diagrams to provide the lowdown on flush riveting.
Stop That Tank!: This film, made for Canada, begins with an interesting cartoon showing Hitler (depicted as a ranting madman speaking in phoney German) and an armada of tanks trying to invade a peaceful-looking village, only to be fought off by a barrage of gunfire from anti-tank guns, so much so that it sends Hitler to Hell. The rest of this short is a dry and technical explanation and description of the Boys Anti-Tank Rifle. Just like the previous short, animation is limited.
Training Film Montage: Narrated by Maltin, this segment contains various clips from the many training films Disney made for the military, including one film that was restricted, because it contained formulas to mix a glue that could be used to create weather-sealed patches on wooden airplanes. This film contains a wide spectrum of instructional films and Maltin also describes the different animation methods used for these works.
Bonus Features
On the Set of Victory Through Air Power: This film contains rare behind-the-scene footage of the 1943 film.
Victory Through Air Power Trailer: A look at how this film was promoted to audiences.GalleriesProduction Art Gallery: This gallery depicts art from many of the cartoons on the first disc. They are all a blend of black and white sketches, color sketches and background paintings.Victory Through Air Power Gallery: A lot of images, divided into four sections (Visual Development, Story, Backgrounds and Publicity), are depicted.The Gremlins Gallery: A few images on an interesting collaboration between Walt Disney and children's author Roald Dahl. Dahl's first book was to be the first adapted into a feature film, too. But the project was scrapped after Dahl was disappointed by the conceptual artwork and Walt Disney couldn't secure copyrights to the term "Gremlins".Poster Gallery: Various attention-grabbing messages depicted on posters in this gallery.Dispatches From Disney's: A disregarded publication.Joe Grant's Sketchbook: Artwork from the Disney character designer and animator.Insignia Gallery: Various Disney insignias and logos used for the war effort.A Conversation With John Hench: Maltin meets with the longest-term Disney employee, who discusses how after the attack on Pearl Harbor, the Burbank studio was instantly turned into a base for the military.A Conversation With Joe Grant: Maltin meets with the longtime Disney animator and storyman, who compares the modern American terror situation to World War II. Grant discusses the changes he saw at the Disney studio once uniformed men showed up. He also lends some insight to the shorts Der Fuehrer's Face, The New Spirit, Education For Death, Reason and Emotion and Victory Through Air Power. He also touches upon the subject of working with Dick Huemer.A Conversation With Roy Disney: Walt's nephew recalls his boyhood memories of the Disney studio during the war and also touches on the Disney insignia's popularity and his own method of promoting Victory Through Air Power.

Tomorrow Land

This set depicts the various episodes of the anthology series that were set in Tomorrowland, many of the episodes directed by legendary Disney animator Ward Kimball.

105,000 sets produced.

Disc oneMan In Space (1955): This Disneyland episode, narrated partly by Kimball, talks briefly about the lighthearted history of rockets and is followed by discussions of satellites, a practical look (through humorous animation) at what spacemen will have to face in a rocket (both physically and psychologically, such as momentum, weightlessness, radiation, even space sickness) and a rocket takeoff into space.
Man and the Moon (1955): This Disneyland episode portrays everything about the Moon. It begins with a humorous look with Man's fascination with the Moon through animation. This segment features the Moon's usage in everything from William Shakespeare and children's nursery rhymes to lunar superstitions and scientific research. Then Kimball comes on with some information on the moon, supplemented by graphics. Kimball then introduces Dr. Wernher Von Braun, who discusses plans for a trip around the moon. Finally, a live action simulation from inside and outside a rocket dramatizes what such an expedition might be like.
Mars and Beyond (1957): This Disneyland episode talks all about the possibility of life on other planets, especially Mars. It also tells of how a trip to Mars will be accomplished and how a trip of that type would entail to spacemen. Narration is courtesy of the great Paul Frees, who does most of the voices in this episode as well.

Disc two
Eyes In Outer Space (1959): short film, the narrator is Paul Frees. The focus here is the weather. It discusses weather superstitions, water, how it changes form, satellites and weather predictions.
Our Friend the Atom (1957): This Disneyland episode talks about the history of the atom, hosted by Dr. Heinz Haber, who compares the discovery of the atom to an Arabian Nights fable of The Fisherman and the Genie. He uses well-known theories, formulas and experiments to discuss the atom, such as E = mc² and a light beam passing through a gold sheet. He illustrates chain reactions in nuclear fission using a table filled with mousetraps represents the atoms and pingpong balls stand in for the new neutrons created from the split.
EPCOT: This is a promotional film from 1967, directed not at the public but at the state and local legislature in Florida, as a means of clarifying the scope of their intent and ambition for their recently initiated "Florida Project".  The centerpiece of the film is Walt's enthusiastic presentation of the plans for EPCOT, not the Tomorrowland-type theme park of today, but rather "an experimental prototype community that will always be in a state of becoming," in the words of Walt. The film details the elaborate radial plan for the city, as well as transportation plans for EPCOT, which called for three levels of transportation, with a high-speed monorail and a WEDWAY People Mover at the highest level.  Walt's presentation was filmed just two months prior to his death in December 1966, and the film was completed after his death.
Bonus Features
The Optimistic Futurist: Maltin meets with author Ray Bradbury on Walt and his creations. Bradbury discusses Disney's optimism, his vision, and his achievements in television and parks.
Marty Sklar, Walt and EPCOT: Maltin interviews Marty Sklar, a longtime Disney employee and Vice President of Walt Disney Imagineering. Sklar discusses Walt as a visionary, plus "Tomorrowland" the program and the section at Disneyland, especially the latter, since Sklar seems to practically be an authority on Disney parks.
Publicity and Publication Gallery: This gallery contains ad materials for "Man In Space"'s theatrical release as a featurette (it accompanied Davy Crockett and the River Pirates), plus Disney's high-class companion books to the series.
Behind the Scenes Gallery: This gallery shows off pictures of the creative talent behind the Tomorrowland programs.
Story and Background Art Gallery: This gallery contains stills, TV storyboards and conceptual art from Man In Space, Man and the Moon and Mars and Beyond.
The Sherman Brothers Performing "There's a Great Big Beautiful Tomorrow": Easter egg bonus begins by showing Richard and Robert Sherman performing the song with Walt himself. Walt then addresses the recipients of the song, the General Electric Pavilion at the 1964 New York World's Fair. To access, go to the Bonus Features menu and select the red horseshoe-shaped object near the bottom of the screen.

3